Aarne Nirk (born 8 May 1987 in Tartu) is an Estonian hurdler.

Achievements

References

External links

1987 births
Living people
Estonian male hurdlers
Sportspeople from Tartu